"To rob Peter to pay Paul", or other versions that have developed over the centuries such as "to borrow from Peter to pay Paul", and "to unclothe Peter to clothe Paul", are phrases meaning to take from one person or thing to give to another, especially when it results in the elimination of one debt by incurring another. There are many other variants and similar phrases in numerous languages. "Maneuvering the Apostles", which has the same meaning, was derived from this expression. In patchwork, "Rob Peter to pay Paul" is an alternative name for the Drunkard's Path patchwork block.

English folklore has it that the phrase alludes to an event in mid-16th century England in which the abbey church of Saint Peter, Westminster was deemed a cathedral by letters patent; but ten years later it was absorbed into the diocese of London when the diocese of Westminster was dissolved, and a few years after that many of its assets were expropriated for repairs to Saint Paul's Cathedral. However, the phrase was popular even before that, dating back to at least the late 14thcentury.

This phrase may have originated in Middle English as a collocation of common namessimilar to, for example, Tom, Dick, and Harrywith the religious connotations accruing later, or alternatively as a reference to Saint Peter and Saint Paul (who are often depicted jointly in Christian art and regarded similarly in theology). One reason for the frequent use of the two names in expressions is the alliteration they form. The aforementioned Peter and Paul were apostles of Christ; both were martyred in ancient Rome and have the same feast day (i.e. the Feast of Saints Peter and Paul on June29). Today, the feast occurs with minimal notice, but it was widely celebrated within England in the Middle Ages. Many churches there were dedicated to the pair. All of that, combined with the medieval English people being almost universally Christian, made it quite common to hear these names together. The expression was coined at a time when almost all English people were Christian and they would have been well used to hearing Peter and Paul paired together.

"Robbing selected Peter to pay for collective Paul" is Rudyard Kipling's adaptation of the phrase, used to criticize the concepts of income redistribution and collectivism. Kipling included the expression in his poem "Gods of the Copybook Headings", and proposed that it should be featured in "catechisms" of the Conservative Campaign Headquarters. The lesson of the phrase in his version, and of the poem in general, was that "only out of the savings of the thrifty can be made the wage-fund to set other men on the way to be prosperous."

See also

Ponzi scheme
Robin Hood

References 

English-language idioms
English proverbs
English words and phrases
Saints Peter and Paul
Debt